Starshy michman is a rank used by the Russian and the Azerbaijani Navy.

Soviet Union and the Russian Federation

Both ranks as well as the career group were taken over by the Armed Forces of the Russian Federation.

 Rank insignia

Insignia

See also
 Ranks and insignia of the Soviet Armed Forces 1955–1991
 Ranks and insignia of the Russian Federation's armed forces 1994–2010
 Naval ranks and insignia of the Russian Federation

References

Military ranks of Russia
Military ranks of the Soviet Union